Alison Dyan Liebert (born August 20, 1981) is a Canadian actress, model and producer. She was a recipient of a Canadian Screen Award for work in the wartime series Bomb Girls.

Life and career
Liebert is a British Columbia native, born in Surrey and raised in Duncan. She has had a keen interest in performing from a young age. 
After graduating from high school, Liebert attended the Canadian College of Performing Arts in Victoria for two years before moving to Vancouver to pursue her dream of becoming a successful television and film actress. Her first major stage role was in the musical 'A Flask of Bourbon', playing the role of Veronica.

Her television credits include roles on Fringe, The L Word, Kyle XY, and a recurring role on Intelligence. In 2008, Liebert was cast as a lead in Sook-Yin Lee's film debut, Year of the Carnivore, the Cuba Gooding Jr. feature Hardwired as well as Blaine Thurier's A Gun to the Head. She also subsequently appeared in the second of three Molson Canadian commercials titled "It's an unwritten code in Canada…". In 2012, Liebert's recent role as Betty, in the wartime miniseries Bomb Girls, received much critical acclaim including a Canadian Screen Award in 2015. Liebert identifies as queer and has discussed using her work to support queer representation.

In 2011, Liebert founded Sociable Films, a boutique film production company based in Vancouver with Nicholas Carella and Michelle Ouellet. Through her company, she has produced projects such as Afterparty A Heart Unbroken, Salvator and This Feels Nice, currently in post-production.

Filmography

Film

Television

Awards and nominations

References

External links
 
 
 
 Ali Liebert on StarBio

1981 births
Living people
Actresses from British Columbia
Canadian film actresses
Canadian television actresses
Canadian voice actresses
People from Surrey, British Columbia
Queer actresses
21st-century Canadian actresses
Canadian LGBT actors
Best Supporting Actress in a Drama Series Canadian Screen Award winners
21st-century Canadian LGBT people